Ictiobus, also known as buffalofish or simply buffalo, is a genus of freshwater fish native to North America, specifically the United States, Canada, Mexico, and Guatemala. At up to 127 years for bigmouth buffalo, they can reach the highest known age for any freshwater teleost, which is a group of more than 12,000 species. Buffalofish are not carp, nor is any other catostomid; they belong to different scientific families having evolved on separate continents. Buffalofish live in most types of freshwater bodies where panfish are found, such as ponds, creeks, rivers, and lakes. Ictiobus were caught by the Lewis and Clark Expedition.

From an angler's point of view, buffalofish were historically not a popular game fish because they are difficult to catch by hook and line (even though they put up a great fight). However, in the 21st Century new sportfisheries have emerged and have quickly made them easy targets of night bowfishing. They are now game fish in practice across much of their range, are in decline, and protective measures are needed.

Species
Five species are placed in the genus:

 Ictiobus bubalus (Rafinesque, 1818) (smallmouth buffalo)
 Ictiobus cyprinellus (Valenciennes, 1844) (bigmouth buffalo)
 Ictiobus labiosus (Meek, 1904) (fleshylip buffalo)
 Ictiobus meridionalis (Günther, 1868) (Usumacinta buffalo)
 Ictiobus niger (Rafinesque, 1819) (black buffalo)

See also
 Haff disease

References

External links
  Ictiobinae Research - Ictiobus
  In Héctor Tobar's 2010 novel Barbarian Nurseries, James "Sweet Hands" Washington remains as the only African-American in a now Hispanic neighborhood because "[He] could still take a couple of buses and find the last place in South Los Angeles that served Louisiana buffalo fish."  (p. 182)
 
 Bizarre Foods Season 9 Episodes 7 Magnificent Mississippi River

 
Catostomidae
Taxa named by Constantine Samuel Rafinesque